Fernando Martín may refer to:

Fernando Martín (businessman) (b. 1947), Spanish entrepreneur, former chairman of Martinsa-Fadesa and president of Real Madrid C.F.
Fernando Martín (footballer) (b. 1981), Spanish football player
Fernando Martín (basketball) (1962-1989), Spanish basketball player
Fernando Martín García, Puerto Rican pro-independence politician

See also
Fernando Martínez (disambiguation)